Rhapis gracilis, the slender bamboo palm, is a multi-stemmed palm tree native to southern China. Its stems are thin to only 10mm in diameter, and it produces round fruit which are usually about 8 mm in diameter.

References

gracilis
Flora of China
Taxa named by Max Burret